The Quasi-Zenith Satellite System (QZSS), also known as , is a four-satellite regional time transfer system and a satellite-based augmentation system developed by the Japanese government to enhance the United States-operated Global Positioning System (GPS) in the Asia-Oceania regions, with a focus on Japan. The goal of QZSS is to provide highly precise and stable positioning services in the Asia-Oceania region, compatible with GPS. Four-satellite QZSS services were available on a trial basis as of 12 January 2018, and officially started on 1 November 2018. A satellite navigation system independent of GPS is planned for 2023 with 7 satellites.

History 
In 2002, the Japanese government authorized the development of QZSS, as a three-satellite regional time transfer system and a satellite-based augmentation system for the United States operated Global Positioning System (GPS) to be receivable within Japan. A contract was awarded to Advanced Space Business Corporation (ASBC), that began concept development work, and Mitsubishi Electric, Hitachi, and GNSS Technologies Inc. However, ASBC collapsed in 2007, and the work was taken over by the Satellite Positioning Research and Application Center (SPAC), which is owned by four Japanese government departments: the Ministry of Education, Culture, Sports, Science and Technology, the Ministry of Internal Affairs and Communications, the Ministry of Economy, Trade and Industry, and the Ministry of Land, Infrastructure, Transport and Tourism.

The first satellite "Michibiki" was launched on 11 September 2010. Full operational status was expected by 2013. In March 2013, Japan's Cabinet Office announced the expansion of QZSS from three satellites to four. The US$526 million contract with Mitsubishi Electric for the construction of three satellites was scheduled for launch before the end of 2017. The third satellite was launched into orbit on 19 August 2017, and the fourth was launched on 10 October 2017. The basic four-satellite system was announced as operational on 1 November 2018.

Orbit 
QZSS uses one geostationary satellite and three satellites in Tundra-type highly inclined, slightly elliptical, geosynchronous orbits. Each orbit is 120° apart from the other two. Because of this inclination, they are not geostationary; they do not remain in the same place in the sky. Instead, their ground traces are asymmetrical figure-8 patterns (analemmas), designed to ensure that one is almost directly overhead (elevation 60° or more) over Japan at all times.

The nominal orbital elements are:

Satellites

Current 4 satellite constellation

Future 7 satellite constellation

QZSS and positioning augmentation 
The primary purpose of QZSS is to increase the availability of GPS in Japan's numerous urban canyons, where only satellites at very high elevation can be seen. A secondary function is performance enhancement, increasing the accuracy and reliability of GPS derived navigation solutions. The Quasi-Zenith Satellites transmit signals compatible with the GPS L1C/A signal, as well as the modernized GPS L1C, L2C signal and L5 signals. This minimizes changes to existing GPS receivers. Compared to standalone GPS, the combined system GPS plus QZSS delivers improved positioning performance via ranging correction data provided through the transmission of submeter-class performance enhancement signals L1-SAIF and LEX from QZSS. It also improves reliability by means of failure monitoring and system health data notifications. QZSS also provides other support data to users to improve GPS satellite acquisition. According to its original plan, QZSS was to carry two types of space-borne atomic clocks; a hydrogen maser and a rubidium (Rb) atomic clock. The development of a passive hydrogen maser for QZSS was abandoned in 2006. The positioning signal will be generated by a Rb clock and an architecture similar to the GPS timekeeping system will be employed. QZSS will also be able to use a Two-Way Satellite Time and Frequency Transfer (TWSTFT) scheme, which will be employed to gain some fundamental knowledge of satellite atomic standard behavior in space as well as for other research purposes.

Signals and services 
The QZSS provides three classes of public service:

 The PNT (Positioning, Navigation and Timing) service complements the signals used by the GPS system, essentially acting as extra satellites. The QZSS satellites sync their clocks with GPS satellites. The service broadcasts at frequency bands L1C/A, L1C, L2C, and L5C, the same as GPS.
 The SLAS (Sub-meter Level Augmentation) service provides a form of GNSS augmentation for GPS interoperable with other GPS-SBAS systems. The principle of operation is similar to that of, e.g. Wide Area Augmentation System. It transmits on L1.
 The CLAS (Centimeter Level Augmentation) service provides high-precision positioning compatible with the higher-precision E6 service of Galileo. The band is referred to as L6 or LEX, for "experimental".

QZSS timekeeping and remote synchronization 
Although the first generation QZSS timekeeping system (TKS) will be based on the Rb clock, the first QZSS satellites will carry a basic prototype of an experimental crystal clock synchronization system. During the first half of the two year in-orbit test phase, preliminary tests will investigate the feasibility of the atomic clock-less technology which might be employed in the second generation QZSS.

The mentioned QZSS TKS technology is a novel satellite timekeeping system which does not require on-board atomic clocks as used by existing navigation satellite systems such as BeiDou, Galileo, Global Positioning System (GPS), GLONASS or NavIC system. This concept is differentiated by the employment of a synchronization framework combined with lightweight steerable on-board clocks which act as transponders re-broadcasting the precise time remotely provided by the time synchronization network located on the ground. This allows the system to operate optimally when satellites are in direct contact with the ground station, making it suitable for a system like the Japanese QZSS. Low satellite mass and low satellite manufacturing and launch cost are significant advantages of this system. An outline of this concept as well as two possible implementations of the time synchronization network for QZSS were studied and published in Remote Synchronization Method for the Quasi-Zenith Satellite System and Remote Synchronization Method for the Quasi-Zenith Satellite System: study of a novel satellite timekeeping system which does not require on-board atomic clocks.

See also 

 Multi-functional Satellite Augmentation System (MSAS)
 Inclined orbit
 Tundra orbit

References 

 Petrovski, Ivan G.  QZSS - Japan's New Integrated Communication and Positioning Service for Mobile Users. GPS World Online. 1 June 2003
 Kallender-Umezu, Paul. Japan Seeking 13 Percent Budget Hike for Space Activities. Space.com 7 September 2004
 QZSS / MSAS Status Kogure, Satoshi. Presentation at the 47th Meeting of the Civil Global Positioning System Service Interface Committee (CGSIC) 25 September 2007

External links 
 Government Of Japan QZSS site
 JAXA QZSS site
 JAXA MICHIBIKI data site 
 JAXA MICHIBIKI data site, English subsite
 JAXA Quasi-Zenith Satellite-1 "MICHIBIKI" 
 JAXA MICHIBIKI Special Site
 ESA Navipedia QZSS article

Navigation satellite constellations
Satellite-based augmentation systems
Space program of Japan
Spacecraft launched by H-II rockets